Park Shin-hye (born February 18, 1990) is a South Korean actress and singer. She has gained recognition as a child on TV shows such as Stairway to Heaven (2003), and Tree of Heaven (2006). Later on, she would achieve further success when she starred in the film Miracle in Cell No. 7, one of the highest grossing Korean films of all time. Considered one of the most prolific actresses of her age, Park has also received recognition for her roles in the romances You're Beautiful (2009), The Heirs (2013), Pinocchio (2014–2015), Doctors (2016), Memories of the Alhambra (2018–2019), and action thrillers #Alive (2020) and Sisyphus: The Myth (2021).

Park ranked 33rd in Forbes Korea Power Celebrity list in 2015, 12th in 2017, 40th in 2021, and 33rd in 2022.

Early life and education
Park was born on February 18, 1990, in Gwangju and grew up in Songpa District, Seoul. She has an older brother, Park Shin-won, a guitarist and composer. In 2001 and 2003 respectively, Park made her first two appearances in music videos for "...Do You Love Me!" and "Flower", both by singer Lee Seung-hwan. She then underwent formal training in singing, dancing and acting under his supervision at Dream Factory.

After graduating from Youngpa Girls' High School, Park attended Chung-Ang University. She studied there for eight years, then graduated with a degree in Theater in February 2016. Park received a service award at the convocation ceremony for her achievement as an artist ambassador for the university.

Career

2003–2008: Career beginnings
Park became known when she played the younger version of Choi Ji-woo's character in the popular Korean drama Stairway to Heaven in 2003. Thereafter she expanded her filmography through supporting roles in several television series, most notably as a rebellious teenager in the drama special Very Merry Christmas in 2004.

Park was cast in her first adult leading role in the South Korean-Japanese melodrama Tree of Heaven (2006), where she received praise from critics for her performance. The series was also aired in Japan, thus giving Park more exposure abroad.

Park made her film debut in the movie Evil Twin (2007), a summer horror flick where she portrayed two roles: one as the main character, and the other as the ghost of the main character's sister, who haunts the other sister after her death. She then played her first antagonist role in romance comedy series Prince Hours, a spin-off to Princess Hours (2006); and starred in the weekend drama Kimcheed Radish Cubes as the female lead.

Aside from acting, Park also hosted the variety program Fantastic Partner from 2006 to 2007, for which she was awarded Best Newcomer in a Variety Show at the MBC Entertainment Awards.

2009–2012: Rising popularity

Park gained more recognition after starring as a cross-dressing heroine in the romance comedy music drama You're Beautiful (2009) alongside Jang Keun-suk. Despite average ratings in South Korea, the series gained a cult following, and earned high ratings in Japan. She released the songs "Lovely Day" and "Without Words" for the drama's original soundtrack.

In 2010, Park starred in the low-budget romantic comedy film Cyrano Agency, which revolved around a dating agency that helps its customers win the hearts of the people they desire. The sleeper hit became a critical and commercial success, attracting 2.7 million admissions nationwide, becoming the 8th best selling film of the year. Park won the "Most Popular Actress" award in film category at the Baeksang Arts Awards. Park also voiced the main character of the animation film Green Days: Dinosaur and I, which premiered at the 15th Busan International Film Festival and received positive reviews.

Park then starred in MBC's youth melodrama Heartstrings (2011) opposite Jung Yong-hwa. With You're Beautiful and Heartstrings, Park experienced a rise in popularity in Japan, and signed an exclusive contract with Japanese management agency IMX. The same year, Park starred in her first Taiwanese drama, Hayate The Combat Butler, based on the Japanese shōnen manga of the same name. She received the Popular Asian Star award at the LeTV Movie and Drama Awards.

In 2012, Park was cast in the third season of KBS drama special, Don't Worry, I'm a Ghost which was broadcast on July 15. Her performance in the drama won her the Best One-Act Special Actress Award at the 2012 KBS Drama Awards. The same year, Park joined the reality show Music and Lyrics, where she collaborated with singer Yoon Gun to compose a song titled "I Think of You". Park was then cast in the third installment of tvN's "Flower Boy" series entitled My Cute Guys along with actor Yoon Shi-yoon, which premiered in January 2013.

2013–present: Breakthrough and mainstream success
In 2013, Park featured in the comedy drama film, Miracle in Cell No. 7, which became one of the highest grossing Korean films. She went on to win the "Best Supporting Actress" award at the 33rd Korean Association of Film Critics Awards.
To celebrate her 10th anniversary as an actress, Park held the "2013 Park Shin Hye Asia Tour: Kiss Of Angel" in four Asian countries, becoming the first actress to hold a tour spanning across Asia. She then starred in actor and singer So Ji-sub's music video "Eraser" for his album Two'clock… Playground, alongside former child actor Yoo Seung-ho.
The same year, Park co-starred alongside Lee Min-ho in The Heirs, a teen drama written by Kim Eun-sook. The Heirs enjoyed immense popularity both locally, with a peak rating of 28.6%, and internationally, having over one billion cumulative views on the Chinese streaming website iQiyi. Park experienced a surge in popularity domestically and internationally, and became a Hallyu star. She was given the "Popular Foreign Actress" award at the 2013 Anhui TV Drama Awards.

In 2014, Park played the role of the Queen in historical film The Royal Tailor. The same year, Park starred in Pinocchio opposite actor Lee Jong-suk, playing the heroine of the drama which has a chronic symptom called "Pinocchio complex", breaking into violent hiccups when she tells lies. Pinocchio became a hit, earning an estimated US$5.62 million for broadcasting rights in just one year.
With The Heirs at the end of 2013 and Pinocchio in 2014, she was included Forbes Korea's Korea Power Celebrity list where she placed 33rd. In the same year, MBC's Section TV Entertainment Relay dubbed her "Nation's Little Sister". Park also received the Prime Minister's Commendation at the Korea Popular Culture Awards for her contribution to Hallyu.

In 2016, Park made her small-screen comeback in SBS' medical drama Doctors, where she played a troubled teenager who later transformed to become a successful doctor. The drama was a hit and topped viewership ratings and popularity charts during its 10-week broadcast. She then featured in the comedy film My Annoying Brother as a judo coach, alongside actor Jo Jung-suk and Do Kyung-soo of Exo. 
The same year, Park was chosen as the Most Favored Korean Actress by fans of the Korean Wave in the United States.
Park next starred in the crime thriller film Heart Blackened, a Korean remake of the Hong Kong film Silent Witness alongside Choi Min-sik, which was released in 2017.

In 2018, Park became a cast member of the reality show Little Cabin in the Woods produced by Na Young-seok, where she and fellow actor So Ji-sub documented their daily activities in a little house located in the Jeju forest. The same year, she starred in tvN's fantasy suspense drama Memories of the Alhambra alongside Hyun Bin, playing double roles as a hostel owner, and a guitar-player NPC. The series was a commercial success and became one of the highest rated Korean dramas in cable television history.

In 2020, Park starred in the disaster film #Alive, based on the original script of Hollywood screenwriter Matt Naylor, alongside Yoo Ah-in. The film was commercially successful, being the 7th highest grossing in South Korea for the year 2020. The same year, she starred in the thriller film The Call directed by Lee Chung-hyun, which revolves around two women living in different time periods who are connected through a mysterious phone call.

In 2021, Park starred in the time-travel thriller Drama Sisyphus: The Myth alongside Cho Seung-woo.

Endorsements
Park has become one of the most in demand endorsers after her hit drama Pinocchio (2014–2015). Brands like Mamonde and Bruno Magli reportedly saw a surge in sales due to Park. Park also endorses several international brands, including Italian luxury brand Bruno Magli, French outdoor clothing brand Millet and Filipino clothing brand Bench.

Park is the first Korean star to be chosen as a model for Visa, and the first Korean celebrity to be chosen as a global ambassador for Austrian jewelry brand Swarovski. British jewellery brand Olivia Burton also chose Park as its first ever brand ambassador for Korea.

Personal life
On March 7, 2018, it was confirmed that Park had been in a relationship with actor Choi Tae-joon since late 2017.

On November 23, 2021, it was announced that Park was pregnant and preparing for marriage with Choi. They got married on January 22, 2022, in presence of friends and family in a church ceremony in Seoul. She gave birth to their first child, a boy, on May 31, 2022.

Philanthrophy 
Park has participated regularly in charitable causes; such as the 'Hopes, Dreams, Happy Trip to Korea' fund raising event hosted by non-profit organization 'Good Friends Save Children' (GFSC) and Lovely Hands campaign by Lotte Department Store. She also makes donations to charitable causes regularly.

Park's support for children in need started in May 2011, when she volunteered in Ghana for nine days as a goodwill ambassador of non-profit organization "Korea Food for the Hungry International" (KFHI). She met five years old Abanna, who had malnutrition. Park continued as sponsored for Abanne.

Since 2011, Park has set up the "Starlight Angel Project", spearheading activities to help children both at home and abroad. The program supports school and library construction, free kindergarten education, free meals for children, construction and repair of village wells, support for goats and pigs, deployment of malaria mosquito nets and prevention education, and more. In 2013, Park established the "Shinhye's Centre" in Ghana,West Africa, which included a library and audio visual hall. The center supported more than 500 students.

During her last visit in the Philippines, she decided to establish her second Shin Hye Center in Manila. Just like her first center in Ghana, the Manila center supports the education and nutrition of children. A second center was built in Manila, Philippines in 2016. 

On November 24, 2016, Park became the 36th inductee of the Korea Food for the Hungry International's Philanthropy Club, a select group of donors who have given at least US$85 thousand to the organization.

On December 20, 2018, Park donated 20 washing machines that were built to wash fire-retardant clothing which were worth a total of around 50 million won. Upon hearing this news, LG Electronics has also pledged to match Park's donation by installing a dryer for fire-retardant clothing with every washing machine she donated.

In 2019, Park was awarded the Philanthropic Celebrity of the year at the 2019 Asia Philanthropy Awards.

In 2022, Park donated money  million to Hope Bridge Disaster Relief Association to help those damaged by large forest fire at the beginning in Uljin, Gyeongbuk And still spread to Samcheok, Gangwon.

Filmography

Discography

Singles

Soundtrack appearances

Others

Ambassador roles

Awards and nominations

Notes

References

External links

 Official Japanese Website 
 Official Korean Website 

South Korean television actresses
South Korean child actresses
South Korean film actresses
South Korean female models
1990 births
Living people
Chung-Ang University alumni
People from Gwangju
South Korean Christians
21st-century South Korean singers
21st-century South Korean actresses
21st-century South Korean women singers